The Amir Chakhmaq Mosque, also known as Dahouk mosque, is a historical mosque from the Timurid era in Yazd, in Iran. It was built on orders of Jalal ed-Din Amir Chakhmaq Shami, who was the governor of Yazd and a general of Shahrukh Mirza. The mosque was completed in 1438. From the viewpoint of aesthetics, dimension and importance, it is one of the most outstanding buildings in Yazd.

The mosque is located south of Amir Chakhmaq Complex. There are inscriptions made of mosaic in Thuluth script of Mohammad al-Hakim on the eastern entrance. 

During the era of Fath Ali Shah, Hossein Attar added a part to its shabestan and restored some parts of the mosque.

See also
 Islam in Iran

References 

15th-century mosques
Mosques in Iran
Tourist attractions in Yazd Province